Słowiński National Park is a national park in Pomeranian Voivodeship, northern Poland. It is situated on the Baltic coast, between Łeba and Rowy.

History
The original idea of creating a preserve here came out in 1946, at a conference in Łeba with scientists from Poznań and Gdańsk. In 1977 UNESCO designated the park a biosphere reserve under its Programme on Man and the Biosphere (MaB). The Słowiński wetlands were designated a Ramsar site in 1995.

The park is named after the Slavic (later Germanized) people known as the Slovincians, who used to live in this swampy, inaccessible area at the edge of Lake Leba. In the village of Kluki there is an open-air museum presenting aspects of this people's former life and culture.

Geography
In the past, the park's area was a Baltic Sea bay. The sea's activity, however, created sand dunes which in the course of time separated the bay from the Baltic Sea. As waves and wind carry sand inland the dunes slowly move, at a speed of 3 to 10 metres per year. Some dunes are quite high - up to 30 metres. The highest peak of the park – Rowokol ( above sea level) – is also an excellent observation point. The "moving dunes" are regarded as a curiosity of nature on a European scale.

Waters, which occupy 55% of park's area, are made up of lakes - Łebsko (maximum depth ), Gardno (maximum depth ) and Dolgie Wielkie (maximum depth ). Both Lebsko and Gardno lakes were previously bays. There are also seven rivers crossing the park, the largest being the Łeba and the Łupawa.

Forests in the park are mainly made of pines. These trees cover 80% of wooded areas, there are also peat bogs of several types. Of animals, the most numerous are birds with 257 species. This is because the park is located on the paths of migrating birds. They feel safe here because human activities are limited. The most interesting species are: erne, eagle owl, crow, swan and various kinds of ducks. Among the mammals, there are deer, wild pigs and hares.

Tourist amenities
Beside the lakes are observation towers and along the trails one can find benches and resting places. Around the park there are many parking sites as well as hotels and camp sites, especially in Łeba.

Images

See also
 Desert of Maine

References

External links

 The Board of Polish National Parks
 Photos
 Videos

National parks of Poland
Biosphere reserves of Poland
Parks in Pomeranian Voivodeship
Protected areas established in 1967
Ramsar sites in Poland
Tourist attractions in Pomeranian Voivodeship
1967 establishments in Poland
Słupsk County